Vysokoye is a rural locality (a settlement) and the administrative center of Vysokovskoye Rural Settlement, Ust-Kubinsky  District, Vologda Oblast, Russia. The population was 478 as of 2002. There are 14 streets.

Geography 
The distance to Ustye is 7 km. Kanskoye is the nearest rural locality.

References 

Rural localities in Ust-Kubinsky District